Wilke te Brummelstroete is a Dutch mezzo-soprano. She has recorded Bach cantatas with John Eliot Gardiner and appeared as the valkyrie Siegrune in Wagner's Die Walküre at the Bayreuth Festival.

Career 
Te Brummelstroete was born in Doetinchem. She studied at the Royal Conservatory of The Hague and made her debut on the opera stage as Dido in Purcell's Dido and Aeneas in 1991. Her roles in Monteverdi operas have included  Proserpina in L'Orfeo, Melanto, Minerva and Penelope in Il ritorno d'Ulisse in patria, and Ottavia in L'incoronazione di Poppea. Her parts in Handel operas were Ruggiero in Alcina, Storgè in Jephtha, Tirinto in Imeneo, and both Juno and Ino in Semele, among others. She performed Tamerlano in Vivaldi’s Bajazet and Costanza in Haydn's L'isola disabitata. In romantic music, she has sung in Schumann's Das Paradies und die Peri and appeared as Bizet's Carmen, sang in Verdi's Requiem, and in the oratorios The Kingdom by Elgar, Berlioz’s Les nuits d'été by Berlioz, and Il tramonto by Ottorino Respighi.

She performed at the Netherlands Opera in 1997 in Francis Poulenc's Dialogues des Carmélites. She sang in 1997 the leading part of Turno in the Dutch premiere of Giovanni Bononcini's Il Trionfo di Carnilla as part of the Utrecht Early Music Festival. She appeared as The Neighbour in Stravinsky's Mavra at the Holland Festival in 1997. She was Teseo in Handel's Arianna in Creta at the Göttingen Handel Festival of 1999, conducted by Nicholas McGegan, and Andronico in his Tamerlano. She performed Mother Goose in Stravinsky's The Rake's Progress. Te Brummelstroete has collaborated with Frans Brüggen and  the Orchestra of the Eighteenth Century on international tours, performing for example Mozart's Requiem and Beethoven's Ninth Symphony. She performed at the Royal Albert Hall at the BBC Proms of 2005, and has sung at festivals such as the Beijing Festival, the Massachusetts International Festival, and the Sydney Festival, among others. From 2006 to 2010 she appeared at Bayreuth Festival as the valkyrie Siegrune in Wagner's Die Walküre, staged by Tankred Dorst and conducted by Christian Thielemann, alongside Linda Watson as Brünnhilde.

Recording 
Te Brummelstroete recorded alto parts in Bach cantatas with John Eliot Gardiner as part of the Bach Cantata Pilgrimage of the Monteverdi Choir. Its Volume I received in 2005 the Gramophone Award Record of the Year (Baroque Vocal). She recorded Bach's St Matthew Passion with Frans Brüggen, and Peter Dijkstra, the Regensburger Domspatzen and the Bavarian Radio chorus and orchestra. She also recorded Mozart's Requiem, Maurice Duruflé's Requiem, and Dutch songs.

References

External links 
 

20th-century Dutch women opera singers
Dutch mezzo-sopranos
Year of birth missing (living people)
People from Doetinchem
Royal Conservatory of The Hague alumni
Living people
21st-century Dutch women opera singers